The women's pole vault event at the 2009 European Athletics U23 Championships was held in Kaunas, Lithuania, at S. Dariaus ir S. Girėno stadionas (Darius and Girėnas Stadium) on 16 and 18 July.

Medalists

Results

Final
18 July

Qualifications
16 July
Qualifying 4.20 or 12 best to the Final

Group A

Group B

Participation
According to an unofficial count, 25 athletes from 17 countries participated in the event.

 (1)
 (1)
 (1)
 (2)
 (3)
 (2)
 (1)
 (1)
 (3)
 (1)
 (1)
 (1)
 (1)
 (1)
 (3)
 (1)
 (1)

References

Pole vault
Pole vault at the European Athletics U23 Championships